The Western Hotel, or Joseph Nichols' Tavern, is a historic building located at Lynchburg, Virginia.  It is the last of the city's many ante-bellum taverns and ordinaries, and is an important example of early Federal-style commercial architecture. It stands at what was for many years the western entrance to the city. It is known to have been operated as a tavern as early as 1815 by Joseph Nichols.

It was listed on the National Register of Historic Places in 1974.   It is located in the Fifth Street Historic District.

References

External links
Western Hotel, Fifth & Madison Streets, Lynchburg, VA: 1 photos, 1 data page, and 1 photo caption page, at Historic American Buildings Survey

Historic American Buildings Survey in Virginia
Hotel buildings on the National Register of Historic Places in Virginia
Federal architecture in Virginia
Buildings and structures in Lynchburg, Virginia
National Register of Historic Places in Lynchburg, Virginia
Individually listed contributing properties to historic districts on the National Register in Virginia